The Chaco side-necked turtle or Chaco sideneck turtle (Acanthochelys pallidipectoris) is a species of turtle in the family Chelidae.
It is found in Argentina, Paraguay, and possibly Bolivia.
Its natural habitat is subtropical or tropical moist montane forests. The turtle possesses long horny spurs on its upper thighs. It is 18 cm in shell length. Like other members of its genus, the turtle buries itself in the mud when the streams run dry, a behaviour possibly parallel to the winter hibernating behaviours of turtles further north.

References

Encyclopedia of Animals: Mammals, Birds, Reptiles and Amphibians, Harold G. Cogger, Edwin Gould, Joseph Forshaw

Acanthochelys
Turtles of South America
Reptiles of Argentina
Reptiles of Paraguay
Endangered animals
Endangered biota of South America
Reptiles described in 1945
Taxonomy articles created by Polbot